Rhabdoblennius papuensis, the Papuan blenny, is a species of combtooth blenny found in the western Pacific ocean, around Papua New Guinea.  This species reaches a length of  SL. In 2004, this species along with Rhabdoblennius nigropunctatus, became the most recently described members of the genus Rhabdoblennius.

References

papuensis
Taxa named by Hans Bath
Fish described in 2004